Böyük Külatan (also, Bëyuk Këlatan, Böyük Kolatan, and Kyulatan) is a village in the Masally Rayon of Azerbaijan.

References 

Populated places in Masally District